Lichnov is a municipality and village in Nový Jičín District in the Moravian-Silesian Region of the Czech Republic. It has about 1,500 inhabitants.

History
Lichnov was founded in 1293.

Sport
Part of the annual Gracia–Orlová women's staged cycle race runs through the municipality.

References

Villages in Nový Jičín District